Nanban may refer to:

Japan 
 Nanban art,  Japanese art of the sixteenth and seventeenth centuries influenced by contact with the Nanban
 Nanban trade, trade between Japan and Western countries from 1543 to 1614

Entertainment 
 Nanban (1954 film)
 Nanban (2012 film)